Juan Carlos Álvarez Vega (born 2 May 1954 in El Entrego, Asturias) is a Spanish retired football midfielder and manager.

References

External links

CiberChe biography and stats 

1954 births
Living people
People from San Martín del Rey Aurelio
Spanish footballers
Footballers from Asturias
Association football midfielders
La Liga players
Segunda División players
Tercera División players
UP Langreo footballers
Hércules CF players
Valencia CF players
Sevilla FC players
Spain amateur international footballers
Spanish football managers
La Liga managers
Segunda División managers
Segunda División B managers
Sevilla Atlético managers
Sevilla FC managers
Cádiz CF managers
CD Castellón managers
Real Jaén managers